HMS Vanguard was a 40-gun ship of the English Royal Navy, launched in 1631 at Woolwich, and was the second vessel to bear the name. Officially she was rebuilt from the first Vanguard, but likely only shared some of the timber and fittings from the previous ship. By 1660, her armament had been increased to 56 guns.

She took part in both the First and Second Dutch Wars. The ship served as the flagship for General at Sea George Monck at the Battle of Portland in 1653, and of Vice-Admiral Joseph Jordan at the Battle of the Gabbard and the Battle of Scheveningen later the same year. She also took part in several actions of the Second Dutch War, including the Battle of Lowestoft in 1665 and the Four Days Battle and St James's Day Fight in 1666. In 1667 Vanguard was scuttled to form a barrier in the River Medway to prevent the Dutch fleet from capturing or burning the British ships there. She was subsequently sold.

Notes

References

Lavery, Brian (2003) The Ship of the Line - Volume 1: The development of the battlefleet 1650–1850. Conway Maritime Press. .
Winfield, Rif (2009) British Warships in the Age of Sail, 1603 - 1714. Seaforth Publishing.

1631 establishments in England
Ships of the line of the Royal Navy
1630s ships
Ships built in Woolwich
Maritime incidents in 1667
George Monck, 1st Duke of Albemarle